WANA-LD, virtual and UHF digital channel 16, is a low-power television station licensed to Naples, Florida, United States. Locally owned by Sun Broadcasting, it is sister to two other Naples-licensed stations: CW affiliate WXCW (channel 46) and low-power Univision affiliate WUVF-LD (channel 2). Fort Myers Broadcasting Company, which owns Fort Myers-licensed CBS affiliate WINK-TV (channel 11), operates WANA, WXCW and WUVF under a shared services agreement (SSA). The four stations share studios on Palm Beach Boulevard (SR 80) in northeast Fort Myers; WANA-LD's transmitter is located on Channel 30 Drive (on a tower shared with several radio stations).

On April 1, 2019, Media Vista Group announced that it was selling its stations, including WANA-LD, to Sun Broadcasting, Inc. for $9.75 million. The sale was completed on July 1.

References

Television channels and stations established in 2003
ANA-LD
ANA-LD
Low-power television stations in the United States
2003 establishments in Florida